Hakea cycloptera, commonly known as elm-seed hakea, is a shrub in the family Proteaceae endemic to South Australia. It is a small spreading shrub with an abundance of pale pink or white flowers from December to August.

Description
Smaller branches and young leaves are white and smooth. The inflorescence consists of 1-14 white or pale pink flowers  and appear in axillary racemes.

Taxonomy and naming
Hakea cycloptera was named by botanist Robert Brown in 1810 and published in Transactions of the Linnean Society of London. The specific epithet (cycloptera) is derived  from the Ancient Greek words kyklos meaning "circle" and pteron for "wing", referring to the shape of the seed wing.

Distribution and habitat
Confined to the Eyre Peninsula in South Australia.  Grows in sandy soil in mallee scrub and withstands moderate frosts. A useful, dense shrub for dry conditions and wildlife habitat.

References

cycloptera
Flora of South Australia
Plants described in 1810